Kerala Varma IV (died February 1853) was an Indian monarch who ruled the Kingdom of Cochin from 1851 to 1853. He is posthumously known as Kaashiyil Theepetta Maharaja.

Reign 

Kerala Varma was the younger brother of Rama Varma XIII and succeeded to the throne on his death in July 1851. Soon after his accession, Kerala Varma embarked on a tour of British India in order to improve his knowledge of the country and visited Coimbatore, Bangalore, Poona, Indore and Benares. At Benares, he was afflicted by chicken pox and succumbed to the disease in February 1853 after a reign of one and half years.

References 

 

1853 deaths
Rulers of Cochin
Year of birth missing
Deaths from smallpox